Al Daih is a village on the north of Bahrain. It lies to the east of Budaiya, west of Al Manama. It was formerly known as Al Bida, Abu Al Zila, and now is called Al Daih, which is derived from the Persian word deh meaning "small village". The vast majority of Al Daih’s inhabitants are Shi’ite.

In a Monday of 2014 three police in the village of Daih were killed by a bomb. Saraya al-Ashtar claimed responsibility.

See also

 List of cities in Bahrain

References 

Daih
Populated coastal places in Bahrain